Matayoshi is a Japanese surname. Notable people with the surname include:

, Japanese writer
Herbert Matayoshi (1928–2011), American politician and businessman
James Matayoshi (born 1968), American anti–nuclear power activist
, Japanese baseball player
, Japanese activist
, Japanese novelist and comedian
, Okinawan martial artist
, Okinawan martial artist

Japanese-language surnames